Pulsaciones (literally Pulsations, title in English Lifeline) is a Spanish thriller series produced by Globomedia for Antena 3. It premiered on January 10 and ended on March 14, 2017, and was a one-season, 10-episode series with a closed ending. The series was selected by consulting agency The WIT among the most remarkable international shows in the 2016 MIPTV Media Market.

Plot
Álex (Pablo Derqui) is a neurosurgeon who has received a heart transplant. His donor is an investigative journalist named Rodrigo (Juan Diego Botto) whose death is shrouded in mystery. Shortly after the operation, Álex starts seeing Rodrigo's memories in the form of nightmares, which will lead to him trying to uncover the causes of his death. He will be joined in this by Lara Valle (Meritxell Calvo), an aspiring young journalist who was mentored by Rodrigo.

Cast
 Pablo Derqui as Álex Puga
 Leonor Watling as Blanca Jiménez
 Ingrid Rubio as Marián Gala
 Meritxell Calvo as Lara Valle
 Juan Diego Botto as Rodrigo Ugarte
 Antonio Gil as Santiago Ariza
 Alberto Berzal as Héctor
 Carolina Lapausa as Olga
 Fernando Sansegundo as Lorenzo Meyer
 Javier Lara as Carlos Meyer
 Manel Dueso as César
 Nacho Marraco as Guzmán
 José Pedro Carrión as Gabriel Escudero
 Ana Marzoa as Gloria
 Cristina Marcos as Amalia Sigüenza
 María Mercado as Mónica

List of episodes

International broadcast
The series has been picked up by Channel 4-backed video on demand service Walter Presents for the United States and the United Kingdom. Netflix has acquired its rights for Latin America as well.

References

Antena 3 (Spanish TV channel) network series
2010s Spanish drama television series
2017 Spanish television series debuts
2017 Spanish television series endings
Psychological thriller television series
Spanish thriller television series
Television series by Globomedia